Franz Swoboda (15 February, 1933 – 27 July, 2017) was an Austrian football defender who played for the Austria in the 1958 FIFA World Cup. He also played for the FK Austria Wien.

References

External links
FIFA profile

1933 births
Austrian footballers
Austria international footballers
Association football defenders
FK Austria Wien players
1958 FIFA World Cup players
2017 deaths